Here follows a list of notable people associated with Suffolk University in Boston, Massachusetts.  This list includes Suffolk alumni, faculty, and honorary degree recipients, as well as students of Suffolk University Law School, the Suffolk College of Arts and Sciences, Sawyer Business School, and the New England School of Art and Design at Suffolk University.

Politics

Edward M. Augustus Jr., class of 1987, city manager of Worcester, Massachusetts (2014–present)
James V. Aukerman, class of 1975, former Rhode Island representative, Attorney, candidate for Rhode Island's 2nd congressional district seat in 1982
Phillip Brutus, class of 1985, former Florida representative; attorney; seeking Florida's 17th congressional district seat
James A. Burke, U.S. Representative from Massachusetts (1959–1979)
David Campbell, New Hampshire State Representative
David Caprio, class of 1992, Legislator, Rhode Island State Representative (1999–2011)
Frank T. Caprio, class of 1991, General Treasurer of Rhode Island (2006–2011)
Gary Christenson, class of 1990, 1992, and 2003, mayor of Malden, Massachusetts (2012–present)
Edward J. Clancy, Jr., former member of the Massachusetts House of Representatives, Massachusetts State Senate and former mayor of Lynn, Massachusetts.
Michael A. Costello, class of 1996, member of the Massachusetts House of Representatives from Essex's 1st district (2002–2014)
Armand Paul D'Amato, class of 1969, former member of the New York State Assembly from New York's 19th district (1973–1987)
Robert A. DeLeo, Speaker of the Massachusetts House of Representatives from Suffolk's 19th district (1991–present)
Salvatore DiMasi, class of 1971, former Speaker of the Massachusetts House of Representatives (1979 - 2009)
James H. Fagan, class of 1973, member of the Massachusetts House of Representatives from Bristol's 3rd district (1993 - 2011)
Christopher Fallon, class of 1981, member of the Massachusetts House of Representatives from Middlesex's 33rd district (1993–2015)
Linda Dorcena Forry, class of 2004, member of the Massachusetts House of Representatives from Suffolk's 12th district (2005–2013), member of the Massachusetts Senate from Suffolk's 1st district (2013–present)
Allan Fung, class of 1995, mayor of Cranston, Rhode Island (2009-present)
William F. Galvin, class of 1975, Secretary of the Commonwealth of Massachusetts (1995–present)
Oz Griebel, class of 1977, 2010 Republican candidate for Governor of Connecticut
Tomo Honda, class of 1997, elected Representative of Fukushima Prefectural Legislative Assembly, The Honorable Councillor to the Fukushima Government, Japan for Nihonmatsu constituency (2005–present)
John Hynes, class of 1924, 49th Mayor of Boston (1950–1960), namesake of Boston's Hynes Convention Center
Brian A. Joyce, class of 1990, Massachusetts State Senator from Norfolk, Bristol and Plymouth districts (1998–2017)
Thomas J. Lane, class of 1925, U.S. Representative from Massachusetts (1941–1963)
Patrick C. Lynch, class of 1992, Attorney General of Rhode Island (2003–2011)
William J. Lynch, class of 1982, chairman of the Rhode Island Democratic Party, seeking Rhode Island's 1st congressional district seat
Ian Mackey, class of 2017, member of the Missouri General Assembly
Juana Matias, class of 2014, state representative
Jeannette A. McCarthy, Mayor of the city of Waltham, MA (2004–present)
Joe Moakley, class of 1956, U.S. Representative from Massachusetts (1973–2001)
Kate Murray, Supervisor of Hempstead, New York
Steven C. Panagiotakos, class of 1989, Massachusetts State Senator from 1st Middlesex district (1992–2011)
John F. Quinn, class of 1990, member of the Massachusetts House of Representatives from Bristol's 9th district (1992–2011)
John H. Rogers, class of 1992, member of the Massachusetts House of Representatives from Norfolk's 12th district (1992–present)
Nelson D. Simons, class of 1925, Chief of Mashpee tribe, town official
Bruce Tarr, class of 1989, Massachusetts State Senator from 1st Essex and Middlesex districts (1994–present)
John F. Tierney, class of 1976, U.S. Representative from Massachusetts (1997–2015)
Timothy J. Toomey, Jr., class of 1985, member of the Massachusetts House of Representatives from Middlesex's 26th district (1992–2016)
Cleon Turner, class of 1992, member of the Massachusetts House of Representatives from Barnstable's 1st district (2005–2015)
Marian Walsh, class of 1984, Massachusetts State Senator from Suffolk and Norfolk districts  (1992–2011)
Daniel K. Webster, class of 1994, member of the Massachusetts House of Representatives from the 6th Plymouth District (2002–2013)
Nina Mitchell Wells, Secretary of State of New Jersey (2006–2010)
Louis G. Whitcomb, class of 1929, United States Attorney for Vermont

Judicial

Peter Agnes, class of 1975, associate justice, Massachusetts Appeals Court, Massachusetts
Jonathan W. Blodgett, class of 1983, current district attorney for Essex County, Massachusetts
Marianne B. Bowler, federal magistrate judge for the District of Massachusetts
Frank Caprio, class of 1965, television judge on Caught in Providence on ABC, Chief Judge Providence, RI Municipal Court
Daniel F. Conley, class of 1983, district attorney for Boston (Suffolk County)
Elspeth B. Cypher, class of 1986, current Justice of the Massachusetts Supreme Judicial Court
Linda S. Dalianis, class of 1974, Chief Justice of the New Hampshire Supreme Court (2010–2018)
Frank Donahue, class of 1921, longest-serving justice of the Superior Court of Massachusetts (forty-two years)
Joan N. Feeney, class of 1978, U.S. Bankruptcy Judge, District of Massachusetts (1992–present)
John E. Fenton, class of 1924, Chief Justice Massachusetts Land Court 1937-1965
Francis Flaherty, class of 1975, Justice of Rhode Island Supreme Court
Frank Gaziano, class of 1989, Justice of the Massachusetts Supreme Judicial Court
Gustavo Gelpí, class of 1991, United States District Court Judge for the District of Puerto Rico
Serge Georges Jr., class of 1996, Associate Justice of the Massachusetts Supreme Judicial Court
Maureen Goldberg, class of 1978, Justice of Rhode Island Supreme Court
Timothy S. Hillman, class of 1973, U.S. District Court of Massachusetts, judge (2011–present) 

Marsha Kazarosian, class of 1982, attorney, handled high-profile cases
William R. Keating, class of 1985, United States Congressman, former district attorney for Norfolk County, Massachusetts
Richard J. Leon, class of 1974, U.S. District Court of the District of Columbia, judge (2002–present)
Gerard Leone, class of 1989, current district attorney for Middlesex County, Massachusetts
Martin F. Loughlin, class of 1951, U.S. District Court of New Hampshire, judge (1979–1995)
Mary S. McElroy, class of 1992, U.S. District Court of Rhode Island, judge (2019–present)
Paul Reiber, class of 1974, Chief Justice of the Vermont Supreme Court
Robert Rufo, class of 1975, Superior Court Justice, Massachusetts
Michael Sullivan, United States Attorney for the District of Massachusetts
Paul Suttell, class of 1976, Chief Justice of Rhode Island Supreme Court
Peter T. Zarella, class of 1975, Justice of the Connecticut Supreme Court
Samuel Zoll, class of 1962, Chief Judge of the Massachusetts District Court

Academia and business

Victoria Almeida, class of 1976, president of the Rhode Island Bar Association
Maryellen Barrett, class of 1989, Vice President of the Boston Clergy Funds
John E. Fenton, class of 1924, president of Suffolk Law School
Jerald G. Fishman, class of 1976, president and CEO, Analog Devices
Neil Goldman, class of 1976, chief legal and regulatory officer of Skype
John Inge, class of 1974, chief counsel and partner for Orrick, Herrington & Sutcliffe
Ronald Machtley, class of 1978, president of Bryant University (1996–present), former U.S. Representative from Rhode Island (1989–1995)
Jane W. McCahon, vice president of Telephone and Data Systems
Martin Meehan, class of 1983, U.S. Representative from Massachusetts (1993–2007), current chancellor of University of Massachusetts Lowell
Irwin Novack, co-owner of Tampa Bay Lightning
Hunter O'Hanian, class of 1985, vice president of Massachusetts College of Art and Design (2008–present)
Gunnar S. Overstrom, Jr., class of 1968, vice-chair of Fleet Boston and president and chief operating officer of the Shawmut National Corporation.
Thomas J. Ryan, class of 1974, general counsel and vice-president of PepsiCo
David Sargent, class of 1954, former president of Suffolk University (1989–2010)
Ken Trevett, class of 1979, CEO and president of Southwest Foundation for Biomedical Research
Léo Valentin, Class of 1948, inventor of The Bird Man Suit, a predecessor of modern-day wingsuit flying
Tranquil Salvador III, LLM Class of 2009, Filipino lawyer, educator, civic leader, columnist , and media advocate for mainstreaming and popularizing law education in the Philippines.

Arts, entertainment, media, and letters

Gleason Archer Jr., class of 1939, theologian
James Bamford, class of 1975, author
Paul Benedict, class of 1960, actor
Cheryl Fiandaca, investigative reporter for WHDH-TV Boston
Jason Hale, class of 2000, CEO, Fat City Magazine and online publications
Dan Harrington, professional poker player
Cheryl Jacques, class of 1987, former executive director of the Human Rights Campaign
Stephen Kurkjian, class of 1970, Pulitzer Prize-winning investigative journalist
Michelle Leonardo, class of 2013, Miss New Jersey USA 2012, Miss New Jersey Teen USA 2008 and Top 10 at Miss USA 2012
John Loftus, class of 1977, author, television commentator
Jenna Mourey, class of 2008, YouTube personality known as JennaMarbles
Neil O'Callaghan, class of 2000, actor, writer and theater producer, Chicago, and Starz hit series Boss
Gerald Peary, Professor of Communication and Journalism at Suffolk University
Adam Pellerin, class of 2002, anchor, reporter, and host, New England Sports Network (NESN)
James Sokolove, class of 1969, television personal injury attorney
Spose, rapper
Ryan Bernier, artistic director, The Second City
Joan Vennochi, class of 1984, Pulitzer Prize-winning investigative journalist
Hayden Voss, contestant on Big Brother 16
Courtney Yates, Survivor: China runner-up; contestant on Survivor: Heroes vs. Villains

Presidents of Suffolk University (1906–present)
Gleason Archer, Sr. (1906–1948)
Walter Burse (1948–1954)
Robert Munce (1954–1960)
Dennis C. Haley (1960–1965)
John E. Fenton (1965–1970)
Thomas Fulham (1970–1980)
Daniel Perlman (1980–1989)
David Sargent (1989–2010)
Barry Brown (2010–2012) (interim)
James McCarthy (2012–2014)
Norman Smith (2014–2015) (Interim)
Margaret McKenna (2015–2016)*
Marisa Kelly (2016–present) (current president)

Notes

External links
Suffolk University Alumni

Lists of people by university or college in Massachusetts
People
Boston-related lists